Coccothrinax alexandri is a palm which is endemic to eastern Cuba.  Like other members of the genus, C. alexandri is a fan palm.  Two subspecies are recognised—Coccothrinax alexandri subsp. alexandri and Coccothrinax alexandri subsp. nitida (León) Borhidi & O.Muñiz.

Andrew Henderson and colleagues (1995) considered C. alexandri to be a synonym of Coccothrinax miraguama.

References

alexandri
Trees of Cuba
Plants described in 1939